Erie Meyer is an American technologist and federal government executive. She currently serves as Chief Technologist of the Consumer Financial Protection Bureau (CFPB) and previously served as Chief Technologist of the Federal Trade Commission (FTC) under FTC Chair Lina Khan in 2021. Meyer had also served as a technologist in the office of then-FTC Commissioner Rohit Chopra. Meyer is the co-founder of the networking list Tech Ladymafia with Aminatou Sow. In 2022, she was named a Tech Titan by Washingtonian magazine.

Education and Awards 
Meyer graduated from American University’s journalism school in 2006, and began her career in digital service delivery and consumer protection.Meyer co-founded Tech LadyMafia with her close friend Aminatou Sow. 

Meyer was named Forbes 30 Under 30 for technology and as part of Fedscoop's Top 50 Women in Tech. In 2018, Meyer was featured among "America's Top 50 Women In Tech" by Forbes.

Career and Government service 
After college, Meyer worked for digital strategy firm Blue State Digital and then transitioned to public service by working for then-Ohio Attorney General Richard Cordray. In that role, she stood up the first digital communications function.

Obama Administration 
When Richard Cordray became the first Director of the Consumer Financial Protection Bureau, Meyer joined his team in Washington and founded the Tech and Innovation team. 

She then served as Senior Advisor to the United States Chief Technology Officer Todd Park at the White House, and co-founded of the United States Digital Service at the White House.  In that role, Meyer worked on Open Data Initiatives, the Presidential Innovation Fellows program, and cross-agency programs to improve technology in government. 

In 2017, Meyer served as the Senior Director at Code for America, a non-profit organization.

FTC and Biden Administration 
In 2018, Meyer joined the Federal Trade Commission (FTC) in the office of then-Commissioner Rohit Chopra as a technology advisor. In that role, she worked on the Safeguards Rule technology oversight issues. In June 2021, Meyer was appointed as the Chief Technologist at the Federal Trade Commission. 

Upon Rohit Chopra's appointment and confirmation as director of the Consumer Financial Protection Bureau (CFPB) in 2021, Meyer moved to serve as a Chief Technologist at the CFPB.

References 

Living people
Year of birth missing (living people)
Federal Trade Commission personnel
American University alumni